Jorge Negri (born 3 June 1933) is an Argentine footballer. He played in ten matches for the Argentina national football team in 1959. He was also part of Argentina's squad for the 1959 South American Championship that took place in Argentina.

References

External links
 

1933 births
Living people
Argentine footballers
Argentina international footballers
Association football goalkeepers
Footballers from Buenos Aires
Racing Club de Avellaneda footballers